Bill Dare is an English author and creator/producer of radio and television comedy programmes.

Biography

Dare is an author and producer/devisor of various (mainly comedy) programmes mainly for BBC Radio and television, including The Mary Whitehouse Experience, Dead Ringers, The Now Show, The Late Edition, I've Never Seen Star Wars and The Secret World, and Brian Gulliver's Travels. He was also the producer of eight series of ITV's Spitting Image. A running gag on the radio version of Dead Ringers was Jon Culshaw, in the style of Tom Baker saying Dare's name in an exaggerated fashion at the end of the credits.

He wrote and appeared in his own Radio 4 sketch show, Life, Death and Sex with Mike and Sue which ran for five series. More recently he has emerged as a more serious writer. Dare's first novel, Natural Selection is published in the UK and US, and his first stage play, Touch, was performed at the Edinburgh Fringe in 2007. His second play, "Misconception" was also performed at Edinburgh.

His radio series, Brian Gulliver's Travels is now a novel, published by Pilrig Press 2013. His third novel, The Billion Pound Lie, is about a man who is mistaken for a lottery winner and was described as 'a funny, touching novel about friendship, love and lottery tickets' by Erin Kelly.

Dare's shows have won several awards including three Radio Academy Gold awards for best comedy.

Dare wrote his first song at the age of 58 and released his first single aged 61.

References

External links

British radio writers
Living people
People educated at St John's School, Leatherhead
Place of birth missing (living people)
Year of birth missing (living people)